(born October 13, 1975) is an athlete from Japan. He competes in the triathlon.

Nishiuchi competed at the first Olympic triathlon at the 2000 Summer Olympics.  He took forty-sixth place with a total time of 1:56:59.76.

Four years later, at the 2004 Summer Olympics, Nishiuchi competed again.  He placed thirty-second with a time of 1:57:43.51.

References

Sports Reference

1975 births
Living people
Japanese male triathletes
Olympic triathletes of Japan
Triathletes at the 2000 Summer Olympics
Triathletes at the 2004 Summer Olympics
20th-century Japanese people
21st-century Japanese people